Frederick Ohlson (29 June 1865 – 20 May 1942) was a New Zealand cricketer. He played eleven first-class matches for Auckland between 1894 and 1903.

See also
 List of Auckland representative cricketers

References

External links
 

1865 births
1942 deaths
New Zealand cricketers
Auckland cricketers
Cricketers from Auckland